The Minsk Trial was a war crimes trial held in front of a Soviet military tribunal in 1946 in Minsk, the capital of Soviet Belarus. Defendants included German military, police, and SS officials who were responsible for implementing the occupational policies in Belarus during the German–Soviet War of 1941–45.

Proceedings
The tribunal heard the case against 18 German military, SS and other officials accused of crimes committed during the occupation of Belarus, in the course of the Soviet-German war of 1941–1945. The defendants included 11 members of the Wehrmacht, including two generals; four members of the police (Ordnungspolizei), including a police general; and three members of the Waffen-SS and SD.

The trial started in December 1945 and concluded in January 1946, with the sentence pronounced on 29 January. All 18 defendants were convicted; 14 were sentenced to death. They were hanged in public, with over 100,000 civilian spectators, in the horse racing venue of Minsk (now Victory Square, Minsk with a memorial street lamp), on 30 January 1946.

Defendants

Controversy 
In 2004, a German article about the trial discussed issues with the confessions, as well as the unusual degree of leniency shown in the cases of the four soldiers who managed to get out of the trial alive. The higher-ranking defendants were judged as having command responsibility over atrocities, including mass murder, committed by their troops. Lower-ranking defendants were judged for their individual crimes.

Mittmann was ruled to have shot and hanged eight people suspected of being connected to partisans, including children, after various forms of abuse, and a peasant family of three who were killed and then had their bodies burned. Fischer was ruled to have shot a 17-year-old Jewish girl and another Soviet civilian suspected of being a partisan. Both of them were hanged.

Rodenbusch confessed that "I myself burned down 15 houses and shot eight people during this whole operation, including two women. In this village I shot four men, two women and three children." However, the court apparently only sentenced him for arson and the shootings of two teenagers suspected of looting. The murder charges for the shootings of the two teenagers were lowered to complicity to murder.

Höchtl had been indicted for 230 murders, but confessed to even more crimes during the investigation. During an anti-partisan operation in February 1943, Höchtl claimed he and his platoon burned 70 houses and killed at least 2000 civilians, and personally claimed to have burned 40 houses and shot 280 people. The court only sentenced Höchtl for complicity to murder, and he was sentenced to 20 years in prison with hard labour.

Although Hetterich said he might've committed up to 15 murders (he said, "If I had hit the target, I would have shot 15 people because I fired 15 shots"), he was never charged with personally killing anyone. He was sentenced to 15 years of hard labour for complicity to murder.

References

Citations

Bibliography

 
 
 
 

1946 in law
1946 in the Soviet Union
The Holocaust in Belarus
Trials in Belarus
War crimes trials in the Soviet Union
War crimes of the Wehrmacht
Nazi war crimes trials
Minsk